Xanthomonas bromi is a species of bacteria. It infects Bromus grass species causing wilt.

References

External links
Type strain of Xanthomonas bromi at BacDive -  the Bacterial Diversity Metadatabase

Xanthomonadales